The Ewing Public Schools is a comprehensive community public school district that serve students in pre-kindergarten through twelfth grade from Ewing Township, in Mercer County, New Jersey, United States.

As of the 2020–21 school year, the district, comprised of five schools, had an enrollment of 3,444 students and 333.0 classroom teachers (on an FTE basis), for a student–teacher ratio of 10.3:1.

The district is classified by the New Jersey Department of Education as being in District Factor Group "DE", the fifth-highest of eight groupings. District Factor Groups organize districts statewide to allow comparison by common socioeconomic characteristics of the local districts. From lowest socioeconomic status to highest, the categories are A, B, CD, DE, FG, GH, I and J.

The Ewing Public Education Foundation, established in 1995, is an independent, not-for-profit citizen's organization helping improve the quality of education in Ewing Township. EPEF provides grants to Ewing Township Schools for innovative educational programs through fund-raising activities, and corporate and institutional sponsorship. The Foundation also seeks to match corporate and organizational donors with teachers to fund additional projects of mutual interest.

History
A court case filed in 1946 challenged a policy of the Ewing Public Schools under which the district provided bus transportation to students living in the districts who attended private parochial schools. In Everson v. Board of Education, the Supreme Court of the United States ruled for the first time that state and local government were subject to the Establishment Clause of the First Amendment to the United States Constitution, but that it had not been violated in this instance.

Schools

Schools in the district (with 2020–21 enrollment data from the National Center for Education Statistics) are:
Elementary schools
W. L. Antheil Elementary School with 623 students in grades PreK-5
Clifford "Kip" Harrison, Principal
Francis Lore Elementary School with 500 students in grades K–5
Kelly Kawalek, Principal
Parkway Elementary School with 358 students in grades K–5
Michelle Conway, Principal
Middle school
Gilmore J. Fisher Middle School with 827 students in grades 6–8
Maggy Hanna, Principal
High school
Ewing High School with 1,080 students in grades 9–12
Edward Chmiel, Principal

Administration
Core members of the district's administration are:
Dr. David Gentile, Superintendent
Dennis Nettleton, Business Administrator / Board Secretary

Board of education
The district's board of education is compried of members who set policy and oversee the fiscal and educational operation of the district through its administration. As a Type II school district, the board's trustees are elected directly by voters to serve three-year terms of office on a staggered basis, with three seats up for election each year held (since 2012) as part of the November general election. The board appoints a superintendent to oversee the district's day-to-day operations and a business administrator to supervise the business functions of the district.

References

External links
Ewing Public Schools
 
School Data for the Ewing Public Schools, National Center for Education Statistics

Ewing Township, New Jersey
New Jersey District Factor Group DE
School districts in Mercer County, New Jersey